Bothrideres is a genus of dry bark beetles in the family Bothrideridae. There are about 13 described species in Bothrideres.

Species 
These 13 species belong to the genus Bothrideres:

 Bothrideres arizonicus Casey, 1924 i c g
 Bothrideres bipunctatus (Gmelin, 1790) g
 Bothrideres cactophagi Schwarz, 1899 i c g
 Bothrideres chevrolati (Grouvelle, 1908) g
 Bothrideres contractus (Geoffroy, 1785) g
 Bothrideres cryptus Stephan, 1989 i c g b
 Bothrideres depressus Sharp, 1895 i c g
 Bothrideres dufaui (Grouvelle, 1908) g
 Bothrideres geminatus (Say, 1826) i c g b
 Bothrideres interstitialis Heyden, 1870 g
 Bothrideres montanus Horn, 1878 i c g b
 Bothrideres planus Chevrolat, 1864 g
 Bothrideres subvittatus Sharp, 1895 i c g

Data sources: i = ITIS, c = Catalogue of Life, g = GBIF, b = Bugguide.net

References

Further reading 

 
 
 
 
 

Bothrideridae
Articles created by Qbugbot
Coccinelloidea genera